Miller Butte is a large rock butte located  southeast of Roberts Butte in the Outback Nunataks of Antarctica. It was mapped by the United States Geological Survey from surveys and U.S. Navy air photos, 1959–64, and was named by the Advisory Committee on Antarctic Names for Carl D. Miller, a geophysicist at McMurdo Station in 1967–68.

References

Buttes of Antarctica
Landforms of Victoria Land
Pennell Coast